The 1980–81 Essex Senior Football League season was the tenth in the history of Essex Senior Football League, a football competition in England.

League table

The league featured 15 clubs which competed in the league last season, along with two new clubs:
Chelmsford City reserves
Halstead Town, joined from the Essex and Suffolk Border Football League

League table

References

Essex Senior Football League seasons
1980–81 in English football leagues